Halton Healthcare (Halton Healthcare Services Corporation) is a regional healthcare organization located in the Greater Toronto Area. It is composed of three community hospitals in Ontario, Canada. It serves the communities of Milton, Oakville, and Halton Hills. The three hospitals serves a community of over 350,000 people. As at 2017/18, Halton Healthcare has 4,022 staff, 1,750 volunteers and 350 physicians. It falls within the boundaries of the Mississauga-Halton Local Health Integration Network.

Member Hospitals
The three community hospitals are:

 Oakville-Trafalgar Memorial Hospital - Originally opened in 1950. Relocated in 2015
 Milton District Hospital - Opened in 1959, expanded in the 1980s and significantly expanded in 2017
 Georgetown Hospital - Opened in 1961

References

External links
 http://www.haltonhealthcare.com
 https://www.haltonhealthcare.on.ca/site_Files/Content/pdfs/01_About/02_Reports-Publications/2017-18_annual_report.pdf

Hospital networks in Canada